Sky Cinema is a British subscription film service owned by Sky Group (a division of Comcast). In the United Kingdom, Sky Cinema channels currently broadcast on the Sky satellite and Virgin Media cable platforms, and in addition Sky Cinema on demand content are available through these as well as via Now TV, BT TV and TalkTalk TV.

In 2016, Sky rebranded its television film channel operations under one single branding on 8 July, the channels in the United Kingdom and Ireland were rebranded from Sky Movies to Sky Cinema; on 22 September in Germany and Austria, the Sky Cinema brand (originally used for the flagship network) was extended to the German channels in the group formerly known as Sky Film; the Italian Sky Cinema channels followed suit on 5 November by adopting the brand packages introduced in the United Kingdom and Ireland earlier.

History

1989–1998: Early years
Launched on 5 February 1989, Sky Movies was originally a single service as part of Sky's original four-channel package – alongside Sky News, Eurosport and Sky Channel (which later became Sky One) – on the Astra 1A satellite system, with the first film shown on the channel at 6.00pm was 1987's Project X. Before launch, Sky signed first-run deals with 20th Century Fox, Paramount, Warner Bros. Entertainment, Columbia, Orion and Buena Vista Distribution Company (which included Touchstone and Disney). One year after it began broadcasts, it became the first Sky channel to scramble its signal, using a encryption system called VideoCrypt.  Anyone attempting to view it without a decoder and smart card could only see a scrambled picture.

On 2 November 1990, Sky Television merged with rival British Satellite Broadcasting, acquiring The Movie Channel. With the launch of the second Astra satellite (1B) was added to the Sky package on 15 April 1991 and the first film shown was 1989's Indiana Jones and the Last Crusade. From the relaunch of the channel under BSkyB, this ident was made by Pacific Data Images and heavily based on NBC's movie opening used from 1987 to 1993. Similarly, Sky Movies was made available to viewers on BSB's old satellite on 8 April earlier that year replaces its music channel, The Power Station. Also in the same year (6 May), Sky Movies and The Movie Channel started broadcasting for 24 hours per day – which previously they had been on air from early afternoon until the early hours of the next morning. In addition of these slots for 6.00pm, 8.00pm and 10.00pm, Sky Movies had several different film genres were used every evening such as:
 Monday Night Comedy
 Tuesday Night Action
 Thursday Night Horror
 After Dark – used for Saturday and Wednesday nights at approximately 11.30pm, which included erotic films with a 18 certificate that often shows sexually explicit material and various adult-oriented content

At the same time, The Movie Channel started to begin its evening films at the later slots of 6.15pm, 8.15pm and 10.15pm, also include showing classic and children's films (at around 4.00pm) during the daytime hours between early morning and late afternoons were used.

For three consecutive years in the early 1990s, Sky Movies carried several non-film premium content known as 'special events' including World Wrestling Federation's annual matches, various music concerts and live boxing competitions such as the first event was Mike Tyson vs. Buster Douglas on 11 February 1990. This was because at this time all of Sky's other channels including Sky Sports, were shown free-to-air and during this period, the service was often referred to as Sky Movies Plus (up until 31 August 1993 shortly before the launch of the new Multichannels package). When Sky Sports became a pay channel on 1 September 1992, Sky Movies stopped showing non-movie related programming.

On 1 October 1992, The Comedy Channel was replaced by Sky Movies Gold, a service dedicated to "classic movies" from 4.00pm to midnight every day and it was added as a three-channel package, with the first film shown at 6.00pm on the new network was 1979's Rocky II. On 31 December of that year, Sky Movies and The Movie Channel stopped broadcasting via Marcopolo satellite.

From 1 February 1993, BSkyB introduced a new system of ratings for Sky Movies, The Movie Channel and Sky Movies Gold were used at various times replacing the British Board of Film Classification certificates which lasted over four years, and remained on air until 31 October 1997:

On 1 October 1995, Sky Movies Gold starts sharing its transponder space with The Disney Channel (which was delayed for over six years) resulting in the service's broadcasting hours changed from 10.00pm to 6.00am.

The two main channels were rebranded under a common brand on 1 November 1997, Sky Movies became Sky Movies Screen 1 and The Movie Channel became Sky Movies Screen 2, as well as Sky Box Office launches a four-channel near on-demand service on 1 December of that year, also carried by Cable & Wireless chooses not to use the service instead opting for Front Row. Following the major rebrand once again on 10 September 1998, as Sky Movies Screen 1 became Sky MovieMax, Sky Movies Screen 2 became Sky Premier and Sky Movies Gold was renamed Sky Cinema.

1998–2007: Digital era
The launch of Sky Digital from the new Astra 28.2°E satellite position on 1 October 1998 was accompanied by a major expansion of channels. Sky Premier and Sky MovieMax both added three multiplex channels each (Sky Premier 2 to 4 and Sky MovieMax 2 to 4), Sky Cinema launched Sky Cinema 2, and additionally, Sky Premier Widescreen – at the time was the only channel devoted to showing widescreen films were all launched exclusively on digital satellite. Also on the same year (15 November), Sky MovieMax and Sky Premier launched on the ONdigital terrestrial platform. On 1 October 1999, Sky MovieMax 5 was launched.

From 1 July 2002, as the Sky Movies channels saw yet another rebranding exercise, the Sky Premier channels were renamed Sky Movies Premier, the Sky MovieMax channels became Sky Movies Max and the Sky Cinema channels became Sky Movies Cinema. Eventually in June 2003, Sky listened to demands for more widescreen films, the service was closed and the majority of films on the remaining channels were actually shown in widescreen. On 1 November 2003, the Sky Movies Premier and Sky Movies Max channels were all brought under one banner as simply Sky Movies 1 to 9. At the same time, Sky Movies Cinema 1 and 2 became Sky Cinema 1 and 2.

Sky Movies along with numerous other channels became available to watch via Sky Mobile TV in 2005, in partnership with Vodafone. From 30 January 2006, Sky Movies 9 and the new Sky Movies 10 started broadcasting from 5.00pm to 3.00am. They were PIN-protected, meaning that for the first time when films with a 15 certificate were able to be shown as early as 5.00pm. With the launch of Sky HD, the two channels were also available in a high-definition format.

2007–2016: Sky Movies goes categorised
Sky Movies was overhauled on 4 April 2007, when the different channels became dedicated to different genres, but three of the HD channels have launched already before the other:

 Premiere (includes +1)
 Comedy
 Action & Thriller
 Family
 Drama
 Classics
 Sci Fi & Horror
 Modern Greats
 Indie
 SD1
 SD2
 HD1
 HD2

Sky later made Sky Movies HD1 and HD2 available to subscribers without HDTV equipment through two channels simulcasting the same content in SDTV format, the channels were known as Sky Movies SD1 and SD2. These channels were renamed Sky Movies Screen 1 and Screen 2 in February 2008, and the HDTV channels were renamed Sky Movies Screen 1 HD and Screen 2 HD accordingly. On 20 March 2008, an additional high-definition film channel called Sky Movies Premiere HD, which is a simulcast version of the current Sky Movies Premiere channel, was added after many requests for the channel from Sky HD subscribers.

Sky also announced that in October 2008, they would launch six new high-definition simulcast channels called Sky Movies Action/Thriller HD, Sky Movies Sci-Fi/Horror HD, Sky Movies Drama HD, Sky Movies Modern Greats HD, Sky Movies Family HD and Sky Movies Comedy HD. This means that almost all Sky Movies channels are broadcast in both standard- and high-definition except for Sky Movies Premiere +1, Sky Movies Classics and Sky Movies Indie which remained standard-definition only until Sky Movies Indie HD launched on 26 October 2009. Sky Movies were rebranded as the part of the various Sky channels on 1 January 2010.

On 26 March 2010, some Sky Movies channels were renamed, the new Sky Movies Showcase that replaces Sky Movies Screen 1 were devoted to box sets, collections and seasons. Sky Movies also reshuffled its bouquet of ten channels to achieve greater "clarity" for subscribers. The changes included Sky Movies Action & Thriller becoming Sky Movies Action & Adventure, Sky Movies Drama becoming Sky Movies Drama & Romance and Sky Movies Screen 2 becoming Sky Movies Crime & Thriller. The Sky Movies HD channels launched on the Virgin Media platform on 2 August 2010.

Sky Movies Classics HD launched on 9 August 2010 was exclusively on Sky, and the channel was also added to Virgin Media on 4 October 2011. Smallworld Cable added the Sky Movies HD channels to their line-up in the first quarter of 2012, followed by UPC Ireland on 16 August 2012.

On 28 March 2013, Sky Movies Disney was launched that effectively replaces Disney Cinemagic, as part of a multi-year film output deal between Sky and The Walt Disney Company. This marks the first time that Disney has been involved in a co-branded linear film channel anywhere in the world, included new Disney films are available on Sky Movies Disney around six months after they have ended their cinema run. To facilitate the channel, Sky Movies Classics has ceased broadcasting, when Sky Movies Modern Greats was rebranded as Sky Movies Greats and Sky Movies Indie became Sky Movies Select, whether the content of the three former brands was merged into Select and Greats.

2016–present: Rebrand and 4K UHD
On 15 June 2016, Sky announced that Sky Movies would rebrand as Sky Cinema on 8 July within this change aligns the channel's naming with those of Sky's film services in other European countries, in consort with Sky plc's takeover of Sky Deutschland and Sky Italia. To compete with subscription video-on-demand services, Sky announced that the rebranded network would premiere "a new film each day", and that it would expand the service's on-demand library. Sky also announced plans to launch a 4K ultra-high-definition feed later in the year. 4K films became available on 13 August 2016 for Sky Q customers in a 2TB box with Sky Cinema and multi-screen packs, as well as 70 were available by the end of 2016.

On 22 June 2020, Sky added a content warning to several older films stating that they "have outdated attitudes, language, and cultural depictions which may cause offence today".

On 23 July 2020, Sky Cinema launched a twelfth channel, Sky Cinema Animation, replaces Sky Cinema Premiere +1 on Sky and Virgin Media UK. Sky Cinema Premiere +1 continued to air on Virgin Media Ireland until its removal on 13 August 2020. The timeshift resumed broadcasting on 6 January 2021, replacing Sky Cinema Disney, which was shut down on 30 December 2020 (with the content moving into Disney+) and was temporarily replaced by Sky Cinema Five Star Movies from the next day (31 December) until Premiere +1's return on 6 January 2021.

On 5 August 2021, Sky agreed a deal with ViacomCBS to launch Paramount+ in the United Kingdom, Ireland, Italy, Germany, Switzerland and Austria by 22 June 2022. The app will be available on Sky Q, and Sky Cinema subscribers will have access to Paramount+ at no charge.

Sky stops broadcasting channels in standard definition for the first time when it switched off the feed of three different services – Sky Cinema Comedy, Sky Cinema Drama and Sky Cinema Thriller – on 31 March 2022.

Channels
Sky regularly gives one, two or three of their Sky Cinema channels a temporary rebrand to air different kinds of seasonal or promotional programming. This table is just an example of some temporary channel rebrandings were included on the list.

Current

Former

Original productions

Sky Cinema has a dedicated production team that produces over 100 hours of original film-related programming each year – including Sky Cinema News and The Top Ten Show. In addition, Sky's close relationships with the film studios means it regularly gets exclusive access for on-set to talenting one-off 'making-ofs' and various talent-based programming.

In 1998, Elisabeth Murdoch (who was BSkyB's director of channels and services at the time) advocated Sky setting up a film funding and production unit (similar to BBC Films and Film4 Productions). The result was Sky Pictures, which existed in order to investing both low-budget and mainstream British films. However, following a lack of success and her decision to leave Sky and set up her own production company called Shine, the unit was scaled back and closed in 2001.

In January 2018, Sky announced a partnership with film distributor Altitude Film Distribution, with the launch of Sky Cinema Original Films, this new brand would distribute films for Sky Cinema's on-demand service, as well as release them into cinemas. The first film under the new banner was the United Kingdom release of the 2017 animated film Monster Family. Other films like The Hurricane Heist, Anon, Final Score and Extremely Wicked, Shockingly Evil and Vile have also been released.

See also
 Starview
 Premiere
 Home Video Channel
 Turner Classic Movies
 Carlton Cinema
 Film4

References

External links
 

English-language television stations in the United Kingdom
Movie channels in the United Kingdom
Sky television channels
1989 establishments in the United Kingdom
Television channels and stations established in 1989
Television channels in the United Kingdom